Idaea deversaria  is a moth of the family Geometridae. It is found in most of Europe, east to central Asia and southern Siberia.

The wingspan is 22–28 mm. The adults fly from June to July. 

The larvae feed on low growing plants and deciduous trees.

Notes
The flight season refers to Germany. This may vary in other parts of the range.

External links

Fauna Europaea
Lepiforum.de

Sterrhini
Moths of Europe
Moths of Asia
Moths described in 1847
Taxa named by Gottlieb August Wilhelm Herrich-Schäffer